Manfred Fritz Bukofzer (27 March 1910 – 7 December 1955) was a German-born American musicologist.

Life and career
He studied at Heidelberg University and the Stern conservatory in Berlin, but left Germany in 1933 for Switzerland, where he obtained a doctorate from the University of Basel in 1936. In 1939 he moved to the United States where he remained, becoming a U.S. citizen. He taught at the University of California, Berkeley from 1941 until his premature death from multiple myeloma.

Bukofzer is best known as a historian of early music, particularly of the Baroque era. His book Music in the Baroque Era is still one of the standard reference works on the topic, although some modern historians assert that it has a Germanic bias – for example, in minimizing the importance of opera (Italian by origin) during the development of musical style in the 17th century.

In addition to Baroque music, he was a specialist in English music and music theory of the 14th through 16th centuries. His other scholarly interests included jazz and ethnomusicology. Furthermore, during his time at Berkeley, Bukofzer conducted several successful operas, including The Beggar's Opera, Dido and Aeneas, and Village Barber.

Among his influential students was Leonard Ratner. He was married to Ilse Kämmerer.

Selected bibliography

References

Citations

Sources

External links
 
 Bukofzer Collection at the University of California, Berkeley

1910 births
1955 deaths
Deaths from multiple myeloma
Jewish emigrants from Nazi Germany to the United States
University of California, Berkeley faculty
20th-century American musicologists
People from Oldenburg (city)